Avenir sportif de Rejiche is a Tunisian professional football club based in Rejiche, that competes in the Tunisian Ligue Professionnelle 1.

The club finished in first place of Group B of the 2019–20 Tunisian Ligue Professionnelle 2 season, earning promotion to the 2020–21 Tunisian Ligue Professionnelle 1.

References 

Association football clubs established in 1980
Football clubs in Tunisia
1980 establishments in Tunisia